Brigantia may refer to:

Goddess
 Brigantia (goddess), a goddess in Celtic mythology
Places
 Brigantia (ancient region) – the land of the Brigantes of ancient Britain, now North England
 the ancient Latin name of several cities and regions:
 Bragança Municipality, Portugal
 Bregenz, Austria
 Briançon, France
 Brianza, Italy
 A Coruña, Galicia, Spain

See also 
 Brigantium (disambiguation)